Richard Gasquet was the defending champion, but chose not to compete in this year.

No.3 seed Nicolás Almagro won the tournament by defeating Romanian Victor Hănescu 6–7(5–7), 6–3, 6–3 in the final. It was the 10th ATP Tournament won by Nicolás Almagro in his career.

Seeds
The top four seeds received a bye into the second round.

Qualifying

Draw

Finals

Top half

Bottom half

External links
 Main draw
 Qualifying draw

Singles